Damais is a surname. Notable people with the surname include:

Émile Damais (1906–2003), French composer and musicologist
Louis-Charles Damais (1911–1966), French orientalist